Na Young-hee (born September 20, 1961), born Bang Suk-hui, is a South Korean actress. Na was born in Boeun, North Chungcheong Province, South Korea.

Filmography

Film
*Note: the whole list is referenced.

Television series

Awards
 2021 2021 SBS Drama Awards Best Supporting Actress in a Mini-Series Romance/Comedy Drama One the Woman nom 
 2018, the 54th Baeksang Arts Awards: Best Supporting Actress (nominee) for My Golden Life
2009 MBC Drama Awards: Golden Acting Award, Actress in a Miniseries (Queen of Housewives)
1989, the 25th Baeksang Arts Awards: Best Favorite Film Actress for 
1989, the third Korean Film Critics Association Awards: Best Actress for 
1989, the 3rd Korean Film Critics Association Awards: Best Actress for 
1982, the 18th Baeksang Arts Awards, New Film Actress for 
1981 the 2nd Korean Film Critics Association Awards: New Actress for 

References

External links

1961 births
20th-century South Korean actresses
21st-century South Korean actresses
Living people
L&Holdings artists
South Korean television actresses
South Korean film actresses
People from North Chungcheong Province